Steven Page or Stephen Page may refer to:

 Steven Page (born 1970), Canadian musician
 Stephen Page (born 1965), Australian choreographer 
 Steven Page, American subject of a murder-suicide

See also
 Stephen Paget (1855–1926), English surgeon